Margaret of France (1254–1271) was a member of the House of Capet and was Duchess of Brabant by her marriage to John I, Duke of Brabant.

Biography 
Born in 1254, Margaret was a daughter of Louis IX of France and his wife Margaret of Provence. 
Margaret was originally in 1257 betrothed to Henry IV, Duke of Brabant, son of Henry III, Duke of Brabant and Alice of Burgundy. Henry was deposed in 1267. Henry's brother, John I, Duke of Brabant married Margaret on September 5, 1270. 

Margaret became pregnant in 1270/1271. Margaret gave birth to a son in 1271. Mother and baby did not survive and both died shortly after the birth.

References

Sources

1254 births
1271 deaths
House of Capet
French princesses
Duchesses of Brabant
Medieval French nobility
13th-century French people
13th-century French women
Deaths_in_childbirth
Daughters of kings
Children of Louis IX of France